Raouia Rouabhia (born June 25, 1978 in Meyrargues, France) is a retired Algerian international volleyball player.

Club information
Current club : Venelle Volleyball (France)

References

1978 births
Living people
Sportspeople from Bouches-du-Rhône
Algerian women's volleyball players
Volleyball players at the 2008 Summer Olympics
Olympic volleyball players of Algeria
French sportspeople of Algerian descent
Algerian expatriates in France
Expatriate volleyball players in France